Kaatsu (Japanese: 加圧, often styled as KAATSU or KAATSU) is a patented exercise method developed by Dr. Yoshiaki Sato that is based on blood flow moderation exercise (or vascular occlusion moderation training) involving compression of the vasculature proximal to the exercising muscles by the Kaatsu Master device.

Invention
In 1966 at the age of 18 while Yoshiaki Sato was attending a Buddhist ceremony in his native Japan, his legs went numb while sitting in the traditional Japanese posture on the floor.  Out of desperation, he began to massage his calves in an attempt to relieve the discomfort during the long ceremony.  He realized that his blood circulation was blocked in his calves.  The feeling was similar to "the pump" he experienced as a bodybuilder, referring to the swelling of one's muscles during a workout. This was when he conceived the original idea of blood flow moderation training.

Over the next 7 years, he experimented on himself by applying different bicycle tubes, ropes and bands at different pressures on various parts of his body. After documenting his self-experiments, learning what worked and what did not, he developed effective protocols to safely modify blood flow for the purpose of enabling muscle growth. 

The "moment of proof" for Sato came at the age of 25. He suffered a badly broken ankle and tore knee ligaments during a skiing accident. Sato's father - a local doctor - told him that his injuries would take six months to heal. During his recovery, Sato performed isometric exercises with his injured leg while using his KAATSU bands. When the cast was removed after 6 weeks, doctors were shocked. Not only had his injuries healed completely, but there was no muscle atrophy. This was an unheard of recovery for such an injury and attracted much attention from other people who asked Sato whether KAATSU would be effective for their health issues. In response, Sato opened a clinic in 1973 (the Sato Sports Plaza), which he operated between 1973 and 1982, treating thousands of people of all ages, and with a variety of health conditions.

Patents
In 1994, Sato applied for his first patents in Japan (Patent No. 2670421), U.S.A. (Patent No. 6149618), and Europe (UK, Germany, France, Italy with 94206403.0) as he produced the first Kaatsu Training bands.  In 1997, Sato introduced the Kaatsu Instructor educational program where his defined protocols were shared with coaches, trainers, physical therapists and physicians throughout Japan.  Over 3,000 Kaatsu Instructors were certified.

Research
Kaatsu Training was named one of the collaborative projects of the University of Tokyo Hospital’s 22nd Century Medical and Research Center.  Sato also began to offer an ischemic circulatory physiology course at the University of Tokyo Hospital and conducted joint development work with the Japan Manned Space Systems Corporation.

In the 1990s, Sato began joint research with Professor Naokata Ishii of the Department of Life Sciences, Graduate School of Arts and Sciences, at The University of Tokyo.  Other researchers in Japan started to explore the benefits of Kaatsu and various research results were submitted to peer-review publications.   In 2014, Dr Sato established the Kaatsu Research Foundation. Research on KAATSU has been conducted in the United States at Harvard Medical School and the University of Missouri, in Japan at the University of Tokyo Hospital and Osaka University, in China at Peking University and Jilin University, in Brazil at the Hospital Israelita Albert Einstein in Sao Paulo, and many other academic research institutions.

Chairman of the Department of Exercise Science at the University of South Carolina, Shawn M Arent, is studying the effects of the method for the US Defense Department.

How Kaatsu works 
According to physical therapist Nicholas Rolnick, if someone exercises while restricting blood flow, blood and metabolic byproducts become "stuck in the muscle, unable to leave." Due to the presence of the metabolites, the muscles become 'fatigued', forcing the muscle to work harder than it normally would need to, to produce contractions under light loads. The extra effort created together with the blood flow restriction, speeds up the process of building muscle mass, increasing strength.

Equipment
The second generation of KAATSU equipment was launched in 2004 with the introduction of the KAATSU Master and the KAATSU Air Bands.  The KAATSU Master device quantified and monitored the precise pressure applied to users’ legs and arms.

In 2005, the KAATSU Master Mini was released in Japan.

A revised KAATSU Master unit and a new KAATSU Nano were released in the United States in September, 2014.

The next generation KAATSU Master 2.0 was launched in the United States, Europe, and the Middle East in July, 2019.

A successor to the Nano, the KAATSU Cycle 2.0 was released in the United States, Europe, and the Middle East in October, 2020.

The KAATSU C3 (successor to the Cycle 2.0) was released in April, 2021.

The KAATSU B1, featuring Bluetooth-controlled compressors mounted on the KAATSU Air Bands was released in September, 2022.

Studies 

 2019 Journal of Applied Physiology
 2020 Strength and Conditioning Journal
 2017 British Journal of Sports Medicine

References

Further reading

External links
KAATSU Global
KAATSU Japan
Japan Kaatsu Training Society
Déjà Vu, Training Of Misty Hyman Redux
KAATSU UK
KAATSU equipment
KAATSU Germany, Austria, Switzerland
German speaking KAATSU Blog

Physical exercise
Japanese inventions
Exercise equipment companies
Exercise-related trademarks